I. F. Wilson was the 20th Surveyor General of Sri Lanka. He was appointed in 1946, succeeding R. J. Johnston, and held the office until 1951. He was succeeded by C. B. King.

References

W